Pepsis menechma, the elegant tarantula hawk, is a species of spider wasp in the family Pompilidae, widely distributed in North America and Central America. It has numerous very different color forms over its range, and has been historically classified as several species.

References

Further reading

External links

 

Pepsinae
Insects described in 1845